Formicoxenus sibiricus is a species of ant in the genus Formicoxenus. It is endemic to Russia.

References

Myrmicinae
Hymenoptera of Asia
Insects of Russia
Endemic fauna of Russia
Insects described in 1899
Taxonomy articles created by Polbot